Oddamavadi or Oddamavady is a town in the Eastern Province of Sri Lanka. Twelve villages are located in Oddamavadi which administered under the Koralai Pattu West Divisional Secretariat 

Oddamavadi is one of the highest fish producing divisions of Batticaloa. The important landmarks of the town are the 250m Oddamavadi steel bridge, Ameer Alli stadium, and the malty day boat landing site. Oddamavadi is the place where the Valachenai lagoon meets the sea. The Valachenai fisheries harbour close by to witness the big boats in action as well as boat mending and net mending activities.

Pasikudah or Pasikuda( historic Tamil translation "Green-Algae-Bay") is a coastal resort town located 8.5 kilometres of Oddamavadi, it used to be a popular tourist destination in Sri Lanka.

Schools 
There are several schools in Oddamavadi including:
 Oddamavadi Central College (National School)
 Oddamavadi Fathima Balika Maha Vidyalayam
 Sharif Ali Vidyalaya 
 Oddamavadi Hijra Maha Vidyalaya
 Siraj Arabic College
 Fathima Zahra Arabic College

References

Towns in Batticaloa District
Koralaipattu West DS Division